Jiwari may refer to:
Jivari, a buzzing sound found in Indian musical tradition
Jiwari-bugyō, officials in Edo period Japan